Zhao Zihao (born 1 June 1997) is a Chinese table tennis player. He is one of the top penhold players in the world today.

He reached his first ITTF World Tour final at the 2019 Austrian Open. He also won the 2018 Belarus Open. At the 2019 Summer Universiade he bagged two gold and two silver medals.

References

1997 births
Living people
Chinese male table tennis players
Universiade medalists in table tennis
Universiade gold medalists for China
Universiade silver medalists for China
Shanghai Jiao Tong University alumni
Table tennis players from Jiangsu
Sportspeople from Nanjing
Medalists at the 2019 Summer Universiade